Vibrio pectenicida is a pathogenic bacterium which attacks larvae of the scallop Pecten maximus. This bacterium does not use glucose or fructose as its carbon sources, but instead uses rhamnose and betaine. A365 is the type strain (= CIP 105190T).

References

Further reading
Vandenberghe, Johan, et al. "Phenotypic diversity amongst Vibrio isolates from marine aquaculture systems." Aquaculture 219.1 (2003): 9-20.

External links
LPSN
Type strain of Vibrio pectenicida at BacDive -  the Bacterial Diversity Metadatabase

Vibrionales
Bacteria described in 1998